St Michael's Church is a parish church in the town of Aberystwyth, Ceredigion, Wales. St Michael's is the fourth church to stand on the site. The first dated from the 15th century but was in ruins by the mid-18th century. Its replacement only stood for some forty years before itself being replaced in 1829-1833 with a church designed by Edward Haycock Sr. of Shrewsbury. Nothing of the two earlier buildings remains. The Haycock church was itself superseded by the present church, built by Nicholson & Son of Hereford in 1886-1890. A fragment of the Haycock church remains to the west of the current building.

St Michael's is an active parish church in the Diocese of St Davids. At the end of the 20th century it claimed the largest Anglican congregation in Wales. It is designated by Cadw as a Grade II listed building.

History
The town of Aberystwyth developed around the Norman castle. Four churches have stood on the site. In the 15th century a church dedicated to St Mary was constructed between the castle and the sea. This church, in ruins by 1748, and its short-lived successor, were replaced by a third church constructed in 1829-1833 by Edward Haycock Sr. Haycock was commissioned by William Edward Powell. a local landowner and Conservative politician who served as Member of Parliament (MP) for Cardiganshire from 1816 until shortly before his death in 1854. Powell was made High Sheriff in 1810 and Lord Lieutenant of Cardiganshire in 1817. He lived at Nanteos and developed much of Aberystwyth in the 1820s; including Laura Place which fronts the present church.

By the later 19th century, the accelerating development of Aberystwyth as a seaside resort brought calls for a larger, and more impressive church. A later William Powell donated further land at Laura Place for the building of a new church in the 1880s. Powell commissioned designs for the new structure from Nicholson & Son of Hereford and the present church was built between 1886-1890. The west vestry is all that remains of Haycock's church, This fragment is a Grade II listed building.

The Cambrian News and Merionethshire Standard celebrated the opening of the new church on 3 October 1890, congratulating "all those who desire to see the town beautified, or who think that a building devoted to the highest purpose should be of the best that human beings can devise and reasonably provide". Further work was carried out on the development of the church in the first half of the 20th century. Major repairs were undertaken to the church roof in the 21st century, following storm damage from Cyclone Dirk.

St Michael's remains an active parish church in the Evangelical tradition. Services are regularly held. In the late 20th/early 21st centuries, the church claimed the largest Anglican congregation in Wales. The church is administered by the Archdeaconry of Cardigan within the Diocese of St Davids.

Architecture
The "large and prosperous church" is built to a three-nave plan, with a vestry and a West tower. A planned spire was never built. The construction materials are York sandstone rubble and Westmoreland slate roofs. The style is Gothic Revival, drawing on English Decorated Gothic. Thomas Lloyd, Julian Orbach and Robert Scourfield, in their Carmarthenshire and Ceredigion volume in the Pevsner Buildings of Wales series, consider it was "old-fashioned", even at the time of its construction.

The interior is faced with Bath limestone and decorated with banding in a contrasting red sandstone. It contains a chancel rood screen by W. D. Caröe dating from the early 20th century. Carved panels in a memorial chapel at the front of the church commemorate the dead of Aberystwyth from the First and Second World Wars. The chapel was constructed in 1992 and involved the moving of the rood screen. The stained glass is mainly by Alfred Hemming, although the East window is the work of Heaton, Butler and Bayne. St Michael's is a Grade II listed building.

Gallery

Notes

References

Sources

External links
 
 Parochial records held at the Ceredigion County Archive

Grade II listed churches in Ceredigion
Aberystwyth
Churches completed in 1890
Aberystwyth, St Michael
Aberystwyth